Futboll Club Dinamo Tirana is an Albanian professional football club based in the country's capital Tirana. They play in the Kategoria e Parë, the second tier of Albanian football, in the 2022–23 season. 

Founded in 1950 during the communist regime, the club was historically affiliated to the Interior Ministry and having won 18 National Championships, it is considered to be the second most decorated club after local rivals KF Tirana.

History
The club was officially founded on 3 March 1950 by the Interior Ministry of Albania during the communist regime under dictator Enver Hoxha. They won four consecutive championships from 1950 to 1953. During this time, Dinamo recorded a hot streak of 25 consecutive wins, a record in Albanian football and 4th longest domestic winning streak in Europe.

In 1967, Dinamo won its 9th championship by leaving Tirana, then 17 Nëntori, one point behind, who was expelled for the tournament three weeks before the end. This championship is not officially recognized by UEFA, however.

In 1989, Dinamo eventually finished third in the league which was won by 17 Nëntori, which made eligible to play in European Cup Winners' Cup for the third time in their history. In the preliminary round of the tournament the team faced Chernomorets Burgas, losing the first leg 1–3 (Demollari scoring the lone goal for Dinamo Tirana) but winning the second 4–0 at home, thus recording its biggest win in a UEFA club competition. The team then was eliminated in the first round by Dinamo București despite winning the first leg in Tirana 1–0.
Dinamo București won the second leg 2–0.

In 1995, the team were renamed KS Olimpik Tirana to leave behind the "communist past", but the club returned to their original name two years later.

After finishing third in the table in 2005–06 season, Dinamo Tirana named Faruk Sejdini as their new coach. One of Albania's best teachers of footballing fundamentals, he had a spell at the club last term before being dismissed by president Besnik Sulaj. Having returned following a spell at Shkumbini Peqin, Sejdini said: "It's nice to be back." On 23 October 2006, he was fired.

At the start of the 2007–08 season, Agim Canaj took over as head coach, replacing Ilir Daja who led Dinamo towards the championship title, after a dramatic win against Partizani 2–1 in the final match, playing for 36 minutes with 9 players. In the summer of 2008, Ilir Daja moved into a position as director in order to make place for Marcelo Javier Zuleta from Argentina. The Argentinian coach also brought with him four Argentinian players; goalkeeper Daniel Bertoya, defender Alejandro Palladino, midfielder Agustín González, and striker Cristian Campozano. Zuleta only lasted for the first Champions League qualification match against Bosnians FK Modriča before he was replaced as coach by Artan Mërgjyshi, for only one match.

Together with Zuleta, the four Argentinian players also left the club. After Mërgjyshi left, Zlatko Dalić, the actual coach of Croatia, was appointed as new coach for Dinamo. He signed a two-year contract with the club. That deal was broken when Dinamo lost its second game in the re-beginning of the 2008–09 season against Partizani. Shkëlqim Muça was then appointed manager of the club five days after of Zlatko Dalić's leave. In the 2009–10 season, Dinamo won the championship again, registering its 18th success.

In 2011–12 season, the club experienced its worst period of all time, finishing last in the league with 13 points from 26 matches, winning only 3 times. They were relegated to the Albanian First Division for the first time in their history. Since the 2012–13 season, the club have played in the Albanian First Division and have risked relegation to the third tier several times.
After spending 9 seasons in the second division, Dinamo clinched the promotion to the Superliga, confirming first place in Group A following a 2–0 win against FK Vora.

Stadium
FK Dinamo Tirana has historically played at Selman Stermasi Stadium which was also known as Stadiumi Dinamo when it first became a stadium. FK Dinamo Tirana now plays on Internacional Complex, Pezë Helmës. This is also known as the main field for FC Internacional Tirana and the training ground for FK Kukësi and FK Partizani Tirana. The stadium is a 1,000 seater stadium and FK Dinamo Tirana also has a training field known as Kompleksi Dinamo in Tirana by the Grand Park of Tirana and next to the Tirana Olympic Park.

Supporters
The "Blue Boys" are an Ultras group for the Albanian football team, Dinamo Tirana. The group were formed in 2008 and have gained 5,000 followers as of 2021. They organise meetings and trips to matches in Tirana and also away matches in Albania and even abroad. They promote Dinamo Tirana to the local public and influence fans of the club in a number of ways.

Honours

Domestic
Dinamo are the second most successful and decorated club in Albania, having won (18) league titles Albanian Superliga .The club also holds the win Albanian Cups (13) and Albanian Supercups (2). The club's most recent trophy was the 2009–10 Kategoria Superiore won on 17 May 2010.

In the international arena he lost a final in the Balkan Cup in 1969 against Beroe Stara Zagora match won in Tirana 1–0 with a goal by Bahri Ishka, but in the return match we lost at the table 3-0 because for political reasons our team you travel to Bulgaria was banned after the regime of Enver Hoxha did not allow it

KS Dinamo Tirana in Europe
In addition to being the leader team in all domestic competitions, Dinamo Tirana have also given the best performances in Europe among Albanian squads winning 3 ties in Europe (including once directly by draw, without playing).

Submarine blues In their European path, Dinamo have played against "big guns" such as: Ajax, Austria Wien, etc. Drawn against teams such as Sporting Lisbona, Beşiktaş, Dinamo București, Olympique Marseille, Brøndby, CSKA Sofia, Sheriff Tiraspol, CZ Jena, Aberdeen,etc.
Dinamo has passed 3 rounds in the European cups, defeating opponents like Ħamrun Spartans, Chernomorets Burgas and Kaunas

 QR = Qualifying Round
 1R = 1st Round
 2R = 2nd Round
 Clubs which ultimately won the tournament in that same season are indicated in bold

Europe
Biggest ever European home victory: Dinamo 4–0  PFC Chernomorets Burgas (30 August 1989)
Biggest ever European home defeat: Dinamo 0–4  Brøndby IF (7 August 2002) Dinamo 0-4  KSC Lokeren
Biggest ever European away victory: FBK Kaunas 2–3 Dinamo (17 July 2002)
Biggest ever European away defeat: Olympique Marseille 5–1 Dinamo (19 September 1990)
 Most European appearances:  Arjan Pisha (24)
 Most European goals:  Sulejman Demollari (6)

Recent seasons

Players

Current squad

Other players under contract

Current staff

Top scorers (Golden Boot)

Former notable players

Historical list of coaches

 Zihni Gjinali (1949-1956)
 Zyber Konçi (1959-1961)
 Xhevdet Shaqiri (1960s)
 Skënder Jareci (1966-1973)
 Sabri Peqini (1974-1975)
 Durim Shehu (1975-1977)
 Saimir Dauti (1977-1980)
 Stavri Lubonja (1979-1981)
 Fatmir Frashëri (1985-1986)
 Bejkush Birçe (1987-1991)
 Neptun Bajko (1991)
 Faruk Sejdini (1992-1993)
 Vasillaq Zëri (1994)
 Faruk Sejdini (1994-1997)
 Gani Xhafa (1997)
 Faruk Sejdini (1998-1999)
 Bujar Kasmi (1999-2000)
 Shpëtim Duro (2000)
 Faruk Sejdini (2000-2001)
 Astrit Hafizi (2001)
 Faruk Sejdini (Sep 2001 – Aug 2002)
 Aurel Țicleanu (2002–03)
 Agim Canaj (May 2003 – Jun 2003)
 Andrea Marko (Aug 2003 – Oct 2003)
 Faruk Sejdini (Jul 2004 – 25 Sep 2004)
 Pedro Pasculli (25 Sep 2004 – 30 Oct 2004)
 Faruk Sejdini (30 Oct 2004 – 15 Jan 2005)
 Pedro Pasculli (15 Jan 2005 – 27 Feb 2005)
 Agim Canaj (27 Feb 2005 – Jun 2005)
 Ramón Cabrero (Jul 2005)
 Luka Bonačić (Jul 2005 – 29 Aug 2005)
 Vasil Bici (29 Aug 2005 – 15 Nov 2005)
 Ivan Katalinić (15 Nov 2005 – 15 Feb 2006)
 Vasil Bici (15 Feb 2006 – 15 Mar 2006)
 Sulejman Demollari (15 Mar 2006 – 25 Mar 2006)
 Vasil Bici (25 Mar 2006 – Jun 2006)
 Faruk Sejdini (Jul 2006 – 25 Oct 2006)
 Redi Jupi (25 Oct 2006 – Jun 2007)
 Agim Canaj (Jul 2007 – 24 Feb 2008)
 Ilir Daja (24 Feb 2008 – Jun 2008)
 Marcelo Javier Zuleta (July 2008)
 Zlatko Dalić (July 2008 – 6 Feb 2009)
 Shkëlqim Muça (06 Feb 2009 – May 2010)
 Luis Manuel Blanco (July 2010 – 31 Dec 2010)
 Ilir Daja (1 Jan 2011 – 7 Feb 2011)
 Artan Mërgjyshi (7 Feb 2011 – Jun 2011)
 Faruk Sejdini (Jul 2011 – 19 Nov 2011)
 Artan Mërgjyshi (19 Nov 2011 – Jun 2012)
 Eduard Zhupa (Jun 2012 - Oct 2012)
 Dritan Mehmeti (Oct 2012 - Jan 2013)
 Edmond Dalipi (Jan 2013 –May 2013)
 Dritan Mehmeti (Jul 2013 - Mar 2015)
 Igli Allmuça (Jun 2015 - Oct 2019)
 Mauro Manzoni (Oct 2019 - Nov 2019)
 Fabrizio Cammarata (Nov 2019– Dec 2020)
 Francesco Moriero (Jan 2021– Mar 2021 )
 Olsi Uku (Mar 2021– May 2021 )
 Bledi Shkëmbi (Jun 2021– Feb 2022)
 Bledar Devolli (Feb 2022– Mar 2022)
 Rodolfo Vanoli (Mar 2022– May 2022)
 Nevil Dede (Jun 2022– Feb 2023)
 Dritan Mehmeti (Feb 2023– )

Managerial records

References

External links
Official website
Dinamo Tirana at UEFA.COM
Dinamo Tirana at EUFO.DE
Dinamo Tirana at Football-Lineups.com
Soccerpedia schedule Dinamo Tirana
Albania-sport.com
Albanian Soccer News
Shqiperia-Futboll

 
Football clubs in Albania
Football clubs in Tirana
Association football clubs established in 1950
1950 establishments in Albania
Police association football clubs